is a Japanese writer, who was born in Hamamatsu and lives in Tokyo. Suzuki is the author of the Ring novels, which have been adapted into other formats, including films, manga, TV series and video games. He has written several books on the subject of fatherhood. His hobbies include traveling and motorcycling.

Bibliography

Some of the books listed here are published in the US by Vertical Inc., owned by Kodansha and Dai Nippon Printing.

Ring series
 Ring trilogy and extended series
 Ring (Ringu) (1991)
 Spiral (Rasen) (1995)
 Loop (Rupu) (1998)
 Birthday (1999) (Short story collection) [tightly intertwined with the trilogy: almost crucially relevant]
 "Coffin in the Sky" [details what happened to Mai Takano in Spiral]
 "Lemon Heart" [prequel to Ring]
 "Happy Birthday" [a direct epilogue to Loop]
 S (2012)
 Tide (2013)
 Manga series
 Sadako-san and Sadako-chan (2019)
 Sadako at the End of the World (2020)

Standalone novels
 Paradise (Rakuen) (1990)
 The Shining Sea (Hikari sasu umi) (1993)
 republished – The Shining Sea (2022 Vertical Publishing) – 
 Promenade of the Gods (Kamigami no Promenade) (2003) 
 Edge (2008)

Short story collections
 Death and the Flower (1995) 
 "Disposable Diapers and a Race Replica"
 "Irregular Breathing"
 "Key West"
 "Beyond the Darkness"
 "Embrace"
 "Avidya"
 Dark Water (Honogurai mizu no soko kara) (1996) (includes an original framing story) 
 "Floating Water"
 "Solitary Isle"
 "The Hold"
 "Dream Cruise"
 "Adrift"
 "Watercolors"
 "Forest Under the Sea"

Short story
 "Drop" (2009) – Printed on three rolls of toilet paper in Japan in Japanese and in English in 2012.

Films adapted from his works
 Ring (Ringu, a.k.a. Ringu: Kanzenban) (1995)
 Ring (Ringu) (1998)
 Rasen (Spiral) (1998)
 The Ring Virus (1999)
 Ring 2 (Ringu 2) (1999)
 Ring 0: Birthday (2000)
 Dark Water (2002)
 The Ring (2002)
 Dark Water (2005)
 Rings (short film) (2005)
 The Ring Two (2005)
 Open Water 2: Adrift (2006)
 Masters of Horror (TV, episode 2.13 Dream Cruise) (2007)
 Sadako 3D (2012)
 Sadako 3D 2 (2013)
 Sadako vs. Kayako (2016)
 Rings (2017)
 Sadako (2019)

Awards and nominations

Japanese awards
 1990 Japan Fantasy Novel Award: Paradise
 1996 Yoshikawa Eiji Prize for New Writers: Spiral
 1996 Nominee for Naoki Prize: Dark Water
 1996 Nominee for Izumi Kyōka Prize for Literature: Dark Water
 1998 Nominee for Japanese SF Award: Loop

U.S. award
 2012 Shirley Jackson Award for Best Novel: Edge

International award
 2021 Bram Stoker Award for Lifetime Achievement

References

External links
 
 
 Koji Suzuki bibliography at FantasticFiction
 Entry in The Encyclopedia of Science Fiction
 J'Lit | Authors : Koji Suzuki | Books from Japan 

1957 births
Japanese horror writers
Japanese male writers
Living people
People from Hamamatsu
The Ring (franchise)